Aadat is a Pakistani drama serial directed by Adnan Wai Qureshi, written by Aliya Bukhari and produced by Cereal Entertainment. It originally aired on TVOne.

Cast 
 Anum Fayyaz as Sana
 Junaid Khan as Azar
 Shermeen Ali as Minaal
 Ali Safina as Farhan
 Adil Murad as Sarmad
 Irsa Ghazal as Neelam
 Azra Mohyeddin as Nayyar
 Ayub Khoso as Ghazi, Minaal's uncle

References

Pakistani drama television series
2016 Pakistani television series debuts
2017 Pakistani television series endings
Urdu-language television shows
TVOne Pakistan